Winter Loversland is the first Christmas album, and third studio album overall, by American recording artist Tamar Braxton. The album was released on November 11, 2013, by Epic Records and Streamline Records.

Background and composition
Winter Loversland is a 10 track set, with 8 traditional "Sleigh Ride", "Santa Baby", "Santa Claus is Coming To Town", "Away in a Manger / Little Drummer Boy", "Merry Christmas Darling", "The Chipmunk Song (Christmas Don't Be Late", "Silent Night", "Have Yourself a Merry Little Christmas" and 2 original songs "No Gift" and "She Can Have You".

On the Target edition of "Winter Loversland", it has 2 additional bonus tracks added to the track listing, including "Santa Bring My Baby (Winter Loversland)" and "Watchin' Me (Yep, I Know It)". The song "Watchin' Me (Yep, I Know It) was originally set to be featured on Braxton's sophomore album Love and War (2013).

Critical reaction

Huffington Post reviewed the album in an article, "hitting refresh on her R&B career in September with her new album, “Love and War,” Tamar Braxton has also released a new Christmas collection titled “Winter Loversland.” Most of the album’s selections are torchy and familiar, but there’s one standout example of what Braxton likes to call an “elephant-in-the-room song.” Here’s Braxton on the importance of R&B truth-telling — even during the most wonderful time of the year".

AllMusic reviewed the album in an article, "Thirteen years passed between Tamar Braxton's first and second solo albums, but Winter Loversland -- released in November 2013 -- followed the latter by only a couple months. It's a brief Christmas album, only 30 minutes in length, in which Braxton covers a lot of familiar ground ("Santa Claus Is Coming to Town," "Silent Night," etc.) yet puts forth maximum effort. In some cases, the amount of energy exerted is greater than what's required—most audibly so on an a cappella update of "The Chipmunk Song (Christmas Don't Be Late)" that features Trina Braxton and dollops of melisma. "Sleigh Ride" and "Santa Claus Is Coming to Town" get traditional vocal arrangements with contemporary beats, while some songs—like "Have Yourself a Merry Little Christmas," including an undeniably stunning closing note, and a serious "Santa Baby"—are played straight. A medley of "Away in a Manger" and "Little Drummer Boy," apart from what sounds like light fingersnaps, is all vocals as well, more an impressive showcase for Braxton's talent and versatility than anything else. Braxton co-wrote the album's lone original, a ballad titled "She Can Have You." Nearly suitable for everyday listening, it's basically a breakup song with Christmas mentioned three times." They also rated the album 2.5/5 stars.

Singles
The music video for "She Can Have You" was released on Braxton's VEVO account on December 4, 2013.

Commercial performance
Winter Loversland debuted at number 43 on the US Billboard 200, with 8,000 copies sold in its first week. The album also charted at number eight on the US Top Holiday Albums, and number 11 on US Top R&B/Hip-Hop Albums.

Promotion
Tamar Braxton was at Universal's CityWalk on December 6, 2013, performing the songs "Little Drummer Boy", "The Chipmunk Song (Christmas Don't Be Late)" (which Trina Braxton joined Braxton on stage), "Sleigh Ride", "Away in a Manger" and "Silent Night". Braxton performed "Silent Night" on The Queen Latifah Show on December 23, 2013. Braxton also performed "Silent Night" on the Daytime show, which she use to co-hosts The Real a year, after the release of the album on December 10, 2014.

Track listing

Credits and personnel

 Performers and musicians

Tamar Braxton - Vocals, Background
Tiyon "TC" Mack - Vocals, Background
Trina Braxton - Vocals (track 7)

 Technical personnel

Tamar Braxton - Composer, Producer (tracks 5, 6, 7, 8)
Antonio "L.A." Reid	Executive Producer
Vincent Herbert - A&R, Executive Producer
Leroy Anderson	- Composer (track 1)
Ross Bagdasarian - Composer (track 7)
Ralph Blane - Composer (track 10)
Richard Carpenter - Composer (track 6)
Dernst "D'Mile" Emile - Producer (tracks 1, 3)
Anthony Clint Jr. - Producer (tracks 2, 6, 10)
J. Fred Coots - Composer (track 3)
LaShawn Daniels - A&R, Composer, Producer (tracks 5, 8)
Katherine Davis - Composer (track 5)
Collin Desha - A&R
Lisa Einhorn-Gilder - A&R
Haven Gillespie - Composer (track 3)
Dalia Glickman	- A&R
Steven Gomillion - Photography
Gene Grimaldi - Mastering
Franz Gruber - Composer (track 9)
Gerald Haddon - Producer
Joan Javits - Composer
JP Robinson - Creative Director
John Kercey - Engineer, Mixing
Dennis Leupold - Photography
Andrew Lloyd -	Producer (track 8)
Tiyon "TC" Mack - Composer, Engineer, Producer (tracks 2, 5, 6, 7, 8, 10)
Hugh Martin -	Composer (track 10)
Joseph Mohr -	Composer (track 9)
Henry Onorati - Composer (track 5)
Jan Ozveren -	Producer
Mitchell Parish - Composer (track 1)
Frank Pooler - Composer (track 6)
Public Domain - Composer
Chad "C Note" Roper - Mixing
Heather Santos - A&R
Travis Sayles - Producer (track 4)
Adonis Shropshire - Composer, Producer (track 4)
Harry Simeone - Composer (track 5)
Philip Springer - Composer (track 2)
Tony Springer - Composer (track 2)
Youngfyre - Producer (track 8)

Charts

Weekly charts

Year-end charts

Release history

References

2013 Christmas albums
Christmas albums by American artists
Contemporary R&B Christmas albums
Tamar Braxton albums
Epic Records albums